Ai Uchida (Japanese: 宮岡•愛; born: November 24, 1984), previously known as Ai Miyaoka, is a former wushu taolu and taijiquan athlete from Japan. She was a multiple-time medalist at the World Wushu Championships and the Asian Games, and also won the bronze medal in women's taijiquan at the 2008 Beijing Wushu Tournament. She is Japan's most renowned wushu athlete at the Asian Games.

See also 

 List of Asian Games medalists in wushu

References

External links 

 Athlete profile at the 2008 Beijing Wushu Tournament

Living people
1984 births
Competitors at the 2008 Beijing Wushu Tournament
Japanese wushu practitioners
Medalists at the 2006 Asian Games
Medalists at the 2010 Asian Games
Medalists at the 2014 Asian Games
Wushu practitioners at the 2006 Asian Games
Wushu practitioners at the 2010 Asian Games
Wushu practitioners at the 2014 Asian Games
Asian Games medalists in wushu
Asian Games bronze medalists for Japan
Asian Games silver medalists for Japan